Russell Donald (9 September 1898 – 31 December 1932) was a Scotland international rugby union player.

Rugby Union career

Amateur career

Donald played for Glasgow HSFP.

He received a knee injury in 1919, but an operation in 1920 was successful, and he was selected by Scotland in 1921.

Provincial career

Donald played for Glasgow District.

He played for Cities District against Provinces District on 11 December 1920.

He played for Scotland Possibles against Scotland Probables on 8 January 1921.

International career

Donald received 3 caps for Scotland, all in 1921.

It seemed that he would go on and collect many more caps, but another knee injury stopped his playing career. Afterwards he went into coaching and became a selector for the national team.

Business career

He worked in Canada for a while, with the firm Pilkington Brothers, the Glass manufacturers. While there he coached rugby, before returning to Scotland, still with the Pilkington Bros. company.

Death

He died in 1932, a victim of an influenza outbreak. He is buried in Eastwood New Cemetery in Glasgow.

His estate was valued at over £1830 pounds.

References

1898 births
1932 deaths
Scottish rugby union players
Rugby union fly-halves
Scotland international rugby union players
Glasgow HSFP players
Glasgow District (rugby union) players
Cities District players
Scotland Possibles players